Ravenna is a butterfly genus in the family Lycaenidae. It is monotypic, containing only the species Ravenna nivea found in Sichuan and Taiwan

References

Theclini
Monotypic butterfly genera
Lycaenidae genera